Daniel Martin Charge (born 10 May 1988) is an English football striker, who was last attached to Isthmian League Division One North club AFC Sudbury.

Career
Charge began his career at Waltham Forest, and was a product of the club's youth system. He made his debut for the club against Boreham Wood in their 6–1 defeat in January 2006, his only appearance for the club. He progressed through the Dagenham & Redbridge reserve team and earned a two-year contract with the club. In November 2008, Charge joined Hitchin Town on loan. He made his debut for Hitchin Town in the club's 1–0 home loss to Halesowen Town. Three days later, Charge scored twice in Hitchin's 4–0 victory against Arlesey Town. He played a total of four league games for Hitchin, before returning to his parent club after Hitchin's 3–2 loss to Cheshunt in the Herts Senior Cup in December 2008. Charge returned to Dagenham, and made his first-team debut after coming on as an 84th minute substitute in a 3–0 victory over Notts County in April 2009. He had his contract cancelled by mutual consent in August, as he "decided the time is right to seek a new Club". Shortly after his release from Dagenham, Charge signed for Conference National club Grays Athletic. He scored his first professional goal for Grays Athletic in the club's 3–1 home defeat to Kidderminster Harriers a week after signing for the club. A week later, Charge scored his second goal for Grays in a 4–2 home defeat to AFC Wimbledon, converting Glenn Poole's cross to temporarily restore parity just after half-time. In September 2009, he scored, this time scoring from close range in Grays' 2–0 victory against Cambridge United. Charge left the club in December 2009, having scored three times in thirteen appearances.

Following his release from Grays, Charge joined Hemel Hempstead Town until the end of the 2009–10 season. He made his debut for Hemel Hempstead in the club's 3–0 defeat to Farnborough, and scored his first goal in a 2–2 draw against Rugby Town in February 2010. Charge scored his second goal for Hemel Hempstead just four days later, scoring the first goal of the game in Hemel's 5–3 defeat to Halesowen Town. He played a total of 14 times for the club, scoring twice, before leaving the club when his contract expired in May 2010. In July 2010, Charge went on trial with League One side Leyton Orient, but was unsuccessful in his attempt to earn a contract at the club. Ahead of the 2010–11 season, Charge signed for Billericay Town. He scored on his debut in Billericay's 3–0 win against Tonbridge Angels, as well as scoring the only goal of the game in a 1–0 victory over Canvey Island. In September 2010, Charge was invited for a two-week trial with Stevenage, and accepted the offer. During his two-week trial at Stevenage, Charge would not feature for Billericay. His trial was unsuccessful, and he returned to Billericay in October 2010, scoring the winner on his return in a 2–1 win against Horsham. Charge went on to have a spell at Boreham Wood before returning to Isthmian League Division One North club Grays Athletic in January 2011.

In February 2012, Charge signed for Isthmian Division One North club AFC Sudbury having been out injured with an ankle injury. He was released from Sudbury, and subsequently joined Grays Athletic again in April for a third spell.

References

External links

1988 births
Living people
English footballers
Association football forwards
Waltham Forest F.C. players
Potters Bar Town F.C. players
Dagenham & Redbridge F.C. players
Hitchin Town F.C. players
Grays Athletic F.C. players
Hemel Hempstead Town F.C. players
Billericay Town F.C. players
Boreham Wood F.C. players
A.F.C. Sudbury players
English Football League players
National League (English football) players
Isthmian League players